Sıla (pronounced as "sla") is a Turkish masculine and feminine name. It has a meaning of "reunite with relatives and loved ones who live in the birthplace/hometown" It may refer to:

 Sıla (Sıla Gençoğlu, born 1980), Turkish singer and songwriter known mononymously 
 Sıla Çağlar (born 2004), Turkish chess player
 Sıla Saygı (born 1996), Turkish figure skater
 Sıla Şahin (born 1985), German actress of Turkish descent

Turkish feminine given names